Pseudocatharylla peralbellus is a moth in the family Crambidae. It was described by George Hampson in 1919. It is found in Ghana and Nigeria.

References

Crambinae
Moths described in 1919